The Snake-Legged Goddess, also referred to as the Anguipede Goddess, was the ancestor-goddess of the Scythians according to the Scythian religion.

Name
The "Snake-Legged Goddess" or "Anguiped Goddess" is the modern-day name of this goddess, who is so called because several representations of her depict her as a goddess with snakes or tendrils as legs.

Mythology
The Snake-Legged appears in all variations of the Scythian genealogical myth with consistent traits, including her being the daughter of either a river-god or of the Earth and dwelling in a cave, as well as her being half-woman and half-snake. Diodōros of Sicily's description of this goddess in his retelling of the genealogical myth as an "anguiped earth-born maiden" implies that she was a daughter of Api, likely through a river-god, and therefore was both chthonic and connected to water, but was however not identical with Api herself and instead belonged to a younger generation of deities of "lower status" who were more actively involved in human life.

The Snake-Legged appears in all variations of the Scythian genealogical myth as the Scythian fore-mother who sires the ancestor and first king of the Scythians with Dargatavah.

History

Origin 
The Snake-Legged Goddess and her role as the foremother of the Scythians had early origins and pre-dated the contacts of the Scythians with Mediterranean religions that influenced the cult of the Great Goddess Artimpasa to whom the Snake-Legged Goddess was affiliated.

The snakes which formed the limbs and grew out of the shoulders Snake-Legged Goddess also linked her to the Zoroastrian chthonic monster , of whom a variant appears in later Persian literature as the villainous figure , who had snakes growing from each shoulder.

West Asian influence 
During the 7th century BCE, the Scythians expanded into West Asia, during which time the Scythian religion was influenced by the religions of the peoples of the Fertile Crescent.

Another influence might have been the Graeco-Colchian goddess , whose mythology as a woman who was turned into a goddess after throwing herself into the sea due to a curse from Hēra connects her to ʿAtarʿatah, and whose sanctuary at Vani had columns crowned with female s emerging from  leaves similar to those of the Snake-Legged Goddess.

Affiliation to Artimpasa 
Reflecting influence from Levantine cults in which the Great Goddess was often accompanied by a minor semi-bestial goddess, the Snake-Legged Goddess, who was also the Scythian foremother, was affiliated to Artimpasa. The Snake-Legged Goddess was so closely affiliated to Artimpasa that it bordered on identification to the point that the images of the two goddesses would almost merge, but nevertheless remained distinct from each other.

This distinctiveness is more clear in how Artimpasa was assigned the role of the king's sexual partner and the divine power of the kings who granted royal power, but was not considered the foremother of the people, and in how neither the Bosporan kings of Sarmatian ancestry nor the Graeco-Roman authors' records assigned Aphroditē or Artimpasa as the Scythians' ancestor.

Cult

Functions
The Snake-Legged Goddess was associated to the life-giving principle but also possessed a chthonic nature, due to which her depictions were placed in Scythian tombs. The status of the Snake-Legged Goddess as the fore-mother of the Scythians associated her with the cult of the ancestors, and, being the controller of the life cycle, was also a granter of eternal life for the deceased.

Some images of Snake-Legged Goddess were discovered in burials, thus assigning both a chthonic and vegetal symbolism to this goddess, which follows the motif of vegetal deities possessing chthonic features. The depictions of the Snake-Legged Goddess on Scythian horse harness decorations imply that she was also a patroness of horses, which might be connected with the love affair between Dargatavah and the goddess beginning after she had kept his mares in the genealogical myth.

Iconography
Several representations are known of the "Snake-Legged Goddess," often crafted by Greek artisans for the Scythian market, most of them depicting her as a goddess with snake-shaped legs or tendrils as legs, and some depicting her as winged, with griffin heads growing below her waist or holding a severed head, with many of them having been found discovered in burials, thus assigning both a chthonic and vegetal symbolism to the goddess, which follows the motif of vegetal deities possessing chthonic features.

The connection of the Snake-Legged Goddess to the life-giving principle is attested by her posture where her hands and legs were spread wide, which constituted a "birth-giving attitude." This complex imagery thus reflected the combination of human motherhood, vegetation and animal life within the Snake-Legged Goddess. Some images of Snake-Legged Goddess were discovered in burials, thus assigning both a chthonic and vegetal symbolism to this goddess, which follows the motif of vegetal deities possessing chthonic features.

The Snake-Legged Goddess is represented with wings on pendants from the Bolshaya Bliznitza kurgan and the Ust-Labinskaya site, and a similar pendant was found in vault from Hellenistic Khersonēsos along with pendants representing severed heads. A fore-piece from a set of horse head plates from the Tsymbalova mohyla is decorated with an image of the Snake-Legged Goddess with snake-legs below which are griffin heads and vegetal tendrils, as well as tendrils above the  hat she wears; this fore-piece was accompanied with  representing  and  heads, as well as fish-shaped side pieces due to the possible influence of the Levantine aquatic goddess ʿAtarʿatah on the Snake-Legged Goddess.

The shapes of the representations of the Snake-Legged Goddess are similar to that of the Tree of Life connecting the upper and lower spheres of the Universe as well as symbolising supreme life-giving power, and therefore merging with the image of the fertility goddess, and was additionally linked to the Iranian creation myth of the  bird resting on the  Tree.

The snakes also connected the Snake-Legged Goddess to the Greek , and Greek-manufactured representations of Medousa, especially in the form of pendants found in the tombs of Scythian nobles, were very popular in Scythia due to her association with the Snake-Legged Goddess.

The Tendril-Legged Goddess 

The imagery of the Tsymbalova fore-piece formed an intermediary with representations of the goddess depicted with tendrils as legs. Among these depictions are images found in burials of the goddess with tendril-legs, wearing a  hat, and surrounded by vegetal ornamentation; these tendril-legged images of the goddess became more numerous during the first centuries CE, and became a common motif in the design of sarcophagi in the Bosporan kingdom. Among the Scythians, one of the vaults in Skuthikē Neapolis was decorated with images of small tendril-legged figures along with figures with radiate heads.

The Goddess holding a Severed Head 
The depictions of the Snake-Legged Goddess holding a severed head which represented the sacrificial offering of a man hanging on the Tree of Life, were another example of Levantine influence, since severed human heads appeared in Levantine goddess cults in which the life-granting goddess demanded death, and re-enacted the death of her partner, whom she loved, emasculated, and killed. The Snake-Legged Goddess therefore also had a blood-thirsty aspect, and there is attestation of human sacrifices to local goddesses accompanied by the exposure of the victims' severed heads on the northern Black Sea coast; one such head placed on an altar close to a representation of a vegetation goddess was discovered in the Sarmatian town of Ilutarum. The Scythian practice of severing the heads of all enemies they killed in battle and bringing them to their kings in exchange of war booty, the depictions of warriors near or holding decapitated heads in Scythian art, as well as the pendants shaped like satyr heads found in the same structures as the representations of the Snake-Legged Goddess and of Artimpasa might have been connected with this aspect of the Snake-Legged Goddess.

The Goddess with Raised Hands 
Multiple headgear pendants from three kurgans respectively found in Mastyuginskiy, Tovsta Mohyla, and Lyubimovskiy have been discovered which represent a goddess with large hands raised in a praying gestures and sitting on the s of two lions in profile. The posture of this goddess depicts an imagery which originated in either Luristan or the Caucasus, and has been interpreted as an act of prayer towards a solar or celestial deity. The depiction of this goddess from the Tovsta Mohyla kurgan shows her half-nude, with uncovered breasts and wearing only a cross-belt above the skirt. The nudity of the Goddess with Raised Hands connect hers with the Snake-Legged Goddess, who is often depicted in topless dress, and with Artimpasa.

A later Bosporan goddess in the same praying gesture is depicted with leaf-shaped or branch-shaped hands. Like the earlier goddess with raised hands, this goddess sits on two lions or on a throne flanked by lions. The leaf-shaped hands of this goddess as well as the wild animals on her sides connect her with the tendril-legged form of the Snake-Legged Goddess, and therefore to Artimpasa.

Rites 
The Snake-Legged Goddess's image was used in shamanic rites due to her affiliation with Artimpasa, with one of the sceptres from the  having been found decorated with a depiction of her, and the other sceptre heads being furnished with bells or decorated with schematic trees with birds sitting on them.

Outside of Scythia

The Kuban Region 
Depictions of the Snake-Legged Goddess were also found in the Sindo-Maeotian areas on the Asian side of the Cimmerian Bosporos, and her representations in her tendril-legged form became more predominant in the first centuries CE and appeared in Bosporan Greek cities, where they became a common design on sarcophagi, as well as in graves in Khersonēsos.

The Kingdom of the Bosporus 
The cult of this goddess was of indigenous Sindo-Maeotian origin and was adopted by the Greeks, who syncretised her with their own  when they colonised the Taman Peninsula.

Since the ancient Greeks did not understand the meaning of the epithet , Strabōn attempted to explain it as being derived from the Greek word , meaning "treachery," through a retelling of a legend about this goddess, according to which she had been attacked by Giants and called on "," that is the god Dargatavah, for help. After concealing "Hēraklēs," the goddess, under guise of introducing the Giants one by one, treacherously handed them to "Hēraklēs," who killed them.

This legend of Aphroditē Apatouros and the Giants has tentatively been suggested to have been part of the same narrative as the Scythian genealogical myth. According to this hypothesis, the reward of Aphroditē Apatouros to "Hēraklēs" for defeating the Giants would have been her love.

Southern Crimea 
The Taurian , the goddess to whom, according to Hērodotos of Halikarnāssos, the Tauroi sacrificed ship-wrecked men and Greeks captured in sea-raids and exposed their heads on a pole, might have been another form of the Snake-Legged Goddess worshipped by non-Scythians.

Thrace 

Their disproportionally large raised hands, which either hold the volutes or are raised to appear as supporting the entablature, are similar to the goddess with her hands raised to her face depicted on a series of Thracian votive plaques. The overall scene represents a Thracian nobleman's posthumous heroisation and depicts the same elements of the Great Goddess-minor goddess complex found in the relation between Artimpasa and the Snake-Legged Goddess.

A Thracian equivalent of the Snake-Legged Goddess might also appear in the series of horse bridle plaques from Letnitsa. One of the plaques depicts a seated male figure (an ancestral hero and likely Thracian equivalent of the Scythian "Hēraklēs") with a female figure (the Thracian Great Goddess) straddling him from above, both of them explicitly engaging in sexual intercourse, and symbolising the king's acquirement of royal power through intercourse with the Great Goddess similarly to the Scythian king's obtaining of royal power through his union with Artimpasa. Behind the Great Goddess is another woman, holding a vessel in one hand and in the other one a branch which obscures the view of the hero; this figure is a vegetation goddess with an ectatic aspect, which is symbolised by the vessel she holds, which contains a sacred beverage, and whose connection to the Great Goddess is analogous to that of the Snake-Legged Goddess with Artimpasa.

Several Thracian stelae and votive plaques have also been discovered depicting a horseman facing a standing or seated Great Goddess while a tree with a coiling snake stands between them, attesting of the similarity of the Thracian and Scythian conceptions of the Great Goddess and the affiliation to her of a snake goddess who was considered the foremother of the people.

References

Sources

Further reading
 Buiskikh, Alla. "On the Question of the Stylistic Influences reflected in the Architecture and Art of Chersonesos: 'Snake-legged Goddess' or Rankenfrau". In: Ancient Civilizations from Scythia to Siberia 13, 3–4 (2007): 157–181. doi: https://doi.org/10.1163/092907707X255746

Scythian mythology
Animal goddesses
Death goddesses
Fertility goddesses
Mother goddesses
Legendary progenitors